Middle Branch Lake is a lake located west of Thendara, New York. The outlet is Middle Branch. Fish species present in the lake are sunfish, brook trout, and white sucker. There trail access off Route 28 on north shore via Big Otter Lake Trail. No motors are allowed on this lake.

References

Lakes of New York (state)
Lakes of Herkimer County, New York